Walworth "Wally" Barbour (June 4, 1908 – July 21, 1982)  was the United States Ambassador to Israel from 1961 to 1973.

Biography 

A graduate of Harvard University, Barbour was one of the longest serving American diplomats in a foreign post, and was described by the Jerusalem Post as a "sagacious political intelligence who could continuously and precisely define for his own country and for his hosts the political aims of both, and more specifically the limits and tolerance of both." In 1961 Barbour was appointed as Ambassador to Israel by President John F. Kennedy. He remained at the post through the administration of Lyndon B. Johnson and passed up an appointment as Ambassador to the Soviet Union by Richard Nixon.

He was considered as a diplomat who was sensitive to the needs of Israel. At a dinner in his honor, Israel Prime Minister Golda Meir said about Barbour "There's no big deal in having an Israel-American friendship society when you have friends like Nixon in the White House and Wally in Israel."

In June of '67 Ambassador Barbour was under tremendous diplomatic pressures during the "Six-Day War" and the "USS Liberty incident", in which a US SIGINT spy ship was attacked in error—according to the Israelis—after being supposedly mistaken for an Egyptian ship whilst flying the American flag. Barbour also arrived at a time of extreme US sensitivity over Israel's burgeoning nuclear weapons development at Dimona in the Negev desert.

He was also a diplomat in Greece, Bulgaria, Italy, Iraq and Egypt, and in the early 1950s he was counselor of the U.S. Embassy in Moscow.  He retired from the Foreign Service after he left Israel in 1973.

The Walworth Barbour American International School in Israel (WBAIS) in Even Yehuda, Israel, as well as a neighborhood and a youth center in Tel-Aviv, are named after him.

Positions held in the United States Diplomatic Service
Source: 
 US Ambassador to Israel (1961–73)
 US State Department Deputy Chief of Mission, London, England (1955–60)
 US State Department Deputy Assistant Secretary for European Affairs (1954–55)
 US State Department Consul, Moscow, USSR (1949–51)
 US State Department Chief, Division of South European Affairs (1947–49)
 US State Department Assistant Chief, Division of South European Affairs (1945–46)
 US State Department Second Secretary-Vice Consul, Athens, Greece (1944–45)
 US State Department Second Secretary, near Govts. in exile of Greece and Yugoslavia at Cairo (1943–44)
 US State Department Second Secretary-Vice Consul, Cairo, Egypt(1942–43)
 US State Department Third Secretary-Vice Consul, Sofia, Italy (1939–41)
 US State Department Third Secretary-Vice Consul, Baghdad (1936–39)
 US State Department Vice Consul, Athens, Greece (1933–36)
 US State Department Vice Consul, Naples, Italy (1931–32)

See also 
 Origins of the Six-Day War
 Samu Incident

Further reading 
 The Attack on the Liberty: The Untold Story of Israel's Deadly 1967 Assault on a U.S. Spy Ship.
 The Six-Day War and Israeli Self-Defense: Questioning the Legal Basis for Preventive War.

References 

1908 births
1982 deaths
People from Cambridge, Massachusetts
United States Career Ambassadors
Harvard University alumni
Ambassadors of the United States to Israel